Luigi Manconi (born 21 February 1948) is an Italian academic and politician, former senator of the Democratic Party.

Biography
Manconi graduated in Political Sciences at the University of Milan and started teaching Sociology in the University of Palermo and the IULM University of Milan.

Journalistic career
In the 1980s, Manconi founded and directed, together with Massimo Cacciari and Rossana Rossanda, the magazine Antigone. He was a columnist and commentator for Italian newspapers, such as Il Messaggero, Corriere della Sera, La Stampa; he is currently a columnist for Il Foglio and La Repubblica.

Political career
In 1994, Manconi was elected, as an independent, senator on the list of the Greens, and again elected in the following elections. He took part in the work of numerous commissions on the issues that have always characterized his militancy and his research activities: justice and guarantee, individual freedoms and social guarantees, and the autonomy of the person.

In 2005, Manconi joined the Democrats of the Left for which he was head of the national civil rights department and a member of the national leadership. He was undersecretary of state for Justice in the Prodi II Cabinet from 2006 to 2008.

In 2013, Manconi was elected senator in the list of the Democratic Party and was appointed president of the Human rights Commission of the Senate.

A former exponent of the No on the occasion of the constitutional referendum of 4 December 2016, on 23 October 2017 Manconi did not participate in the votes of confidence on Rosatellum, the new electoral law. In October and December 2017 he launched the initiative of a hunger strike for the approval of the jus soli law, which did not reach the quorum in the Senate.

On 2 February 2018, Prime Minister Paolo Gentiloni appointed Manconi as coordinator of the Office for the Promotion of Equal Treatment and the Removal of Discrimination established within the Department for Equal Opportunities.

Personal life
He is the father of three children: Davide, Giacomo, and Giulia, the latter had by his second wife, journalist Bianca Berlinguer. Since 2007 he has suffered from a severe form of low vision caused by several factors, including glaucoma, retinal detachment, and severe myopia.

External links
Files about his parliamentary activities (in Italian): XII, XIII, XVII legislature

1948 births
Living people
People from Sassari
20th-century Italian politicians
21st-century Italian politicians
Federation of the Greens politicians
Democrats of the Left politicians
Democratic Party (Italy) politicians

University of Milan alumni
Members of the Senate of the Republic (Italy)
Academic staff of the IULM University of Milan
Academic staff of the University of Palermo
Candidates for President of Italy